Qatar competed at the 2009 World Championships in Athletics from 15–23 August. A team of 9 athletes was announced in preparation for the competition. Selected athletes had achieved one of the competition's qualifying standards.

Team selection

Track and road events

Field and combined events

References
Entry list. European Athletic Association (2009-07-30). Retrieved on 2009-08-16.

External links
Official competition website

Nations at the 2009 World Championships in Athletics
World Championships in Athletics
Qatar at the World Championships in Athletics